Lake Algonquin is a lake located west of Wells, New York. Fish species present in the lake are sunfish, yellow perch, and walleye. There is a boat launch of Algonquin Road on the west shore. There is also a carry down off Craig Road on the northeast shore.

References

Lakes of New York (state)
Lakes of Hamilton County, New York